Mohammed Tuah Khamis (born 27 February 1985) is a Ghanaian-American soccer player who plays as a forward.

Club career 
Kuffour was bornin Nyakrom. He was signed by D.C. United as a developmental player during the 2004 season, after having immigrated to the United States from Ghana and receiving citizenship. Before playing for United, Kuffour most recently played for Super Rainbows of Ghana. Kuffour was released by D.C. United in November 2005 and joined to Liberty Professionals FC after three years with the club signed for Accra Hearts of Oak SC on 18 October 2009. 
.

Clubs 
 Apam Secondary School (2001–2003)
 Super Rainbows (2003)
 Assi National FC (2004)
 D.C. United (2004–2005)
 Liberty Professionals FC (2005–2009)
 Accra Hearts of Oak SC (2009–2010)

International career 
Kuffour was a member of the Black Meteors.

Personal life 
Mohammed Tuah Khamis was born as Nana Kwame Kuffour and converted to Islam in 2006.

References

External links
 
 
 Profile at mlssoccer.com

1985 births
Living people
Ghanaian emigrants to the United States
Ghanaian footballers
Association football forwards
Major League Soccer players
D.C. United players
Accra Hearts of Oak S.C. players
Liberty Professionals F.C. players